The 11th Parliament of Lower Canada was in session from December 14, 1820, to July 6, 1824. Elections to the Legislative Assembly in Lower Canada had been held in July 1820. All sessions were held at Quebec City.

References

External links 
  Assemblée nationale du Québec (French)
Journals of the House of Assembly of Lower Canada ..., John Neilson (1821)

Parliaments of Lower Canada
1820 establishments in Lower Canada
1824 disestablishments in Lower Canada